The Statute Law (Repeals) Act 2004 (c. 14) is an Act of the Parliament of the United Kingdom.

It implements recommendations of the Law Commission and the Scottish Law Commission.

Schedule 1 - Repeals
This Schedule is divided into the following parts:
Part 1 Administration of Justice
Part 2 Agriculture
Part 3 Allotments and smallholdings
Part 4 Aviation
Part 5 Defunct bodies
Part 6 Ecclesiastical
Part 7 Education
Part 8 Employment
Part 9 Finance
Part 10 Local government
Part 11 Pensions
Part 12 Property
Part 13 Public health
Part 14 Road traffic
Part 15 Scottish Acts
Part 16 Trade and industry
Part 17 Miscellaneous

See also
Statute Law (Repeals) Act

References
Halsbury's Statutes. Fourth Edition. 2008 Reissue. Volume 41. Page 1103.

External links
The Statute Law (Repeals) Act 2004, as amended from the National Archives.
The Statute Law (Repeals) Act 2004, as originally enacted from the National Archives.

United Kingdom Acts of Parliament 2004